Francis Vincent may refer to:
 Fay Vincent (Francis Thomas Vincent, born 1938), American former entertainment lawyer and sports executive, commissioner of Major League Baseball 
Sir Francis Vincent, 1st Baronet (c. 1568–1640), MP for Surrey 1626
Sir Francis Vincent, 3rd Baronet (c. 1621–1670), MP for Dover
Sir Francis Vincent, 5th Baronet (1646–1736), MP for Surrey 1690–1695 and 1710–1713
Sir Francis Vincent, 7th Baronet (c. 1717–1775), MP for Surrey 1761–1775
Sir Francis Vincent, 10th Baronet (1803–1880), English Whig politician, MP for St Albans 1831–1835

See also
Frank Vincent (disambiguation)